Gerri may refer to:

Gerri, a feminine given name:
Gerri Elliott (21st century), American businesswoman
Gerri Green (born 1995), American football player
Gerri Lawlor (21st century), American actress
Gerri Peev (21st century), Bulgarian-British journalist
Gerri Russell (born 1962), American writer
Gerri Santoro (1935–1964), American woman who died from an illegal abortion
Gerri Sinclair (21st century), Canadian businesswoman
Gerri Whittington (1931–1993), African-American secretary
Gerri Willis (21st century), American journalist
Gerri de la Sal, the administrative center of the municipality of Baix Pallars in Spain
Santa Maria de Gerri, a monastery in Gerri
GERRI, a geriatric diagnostic tool